Aggressive driving is defined by the National Highway Traffic Safety Administration as the behaviour of an individual who "commits a combination of moving traffic offences so as to endanger other persons or property."

Definitions

In the UK, Road Drivers offers a basic definition of aggressive driving:

There are other alternative definitions:

Behaviours associated  
By definition, aggressive driving is 'committing unprovoked attacks on other drivers', attacks such as not yielding to vehicles wishing to pass. 
The U.S. National Highway Traffic Safety Administration (NHTSA) has implemented the Fatality Analysis Reporting System,  which identifies actions that would fall under the category of aggressive driving, including:  
 Following improperly / tailgating.
 Improper or erratic lane changing 
 Illegal driving on a road shoulder, in a ditch, or on a sidewalk or median.
 Passing where prohibited.
 Operating the vehicle in an erratic, reckless, careless, or negligent manner or suddenly changing speeds without changing lanes.
 Failure to yield right of way.
 Failure to obey traffic signs, traffic control devices, or traffic officers, failure to observe safety zone traffic laws.
 Failure to observe warnings or instructions on vehicle displaying them.
 Failure to signal.
 Driving too fast for conditions. 
 Racing.
 Making an improper turn.

Effects 
According to the Fatality Analysis Reporting System, aggressive driving played a role in 56% of fatal crashes between 2003 and 2007, most of which were attributed to excessive speed.  Aggressive driving also negatively impacts the environment as it burns 37% more fuel and produces more toxic fumes.

See also 

 Bike rage
 Road rage
 Carjacking
 Motor vehicle theft
 Street racing
 Drive-by shooting
 Car chase
 Traffic stop
 Traffic ticket
 Joyride
 Reckless driving
 Tailgating
 Brake test

References

External links
 National Highway Traffic Safety Administration

Driving
Habits
Road safety